Xylota brachygaster is a species of hoverfly in the family Syrphidae.

Distribution
Mexico.

References

Eristalinae
Insects described in 1892
Diptera of North America
Taxa named by Samuel Wendell Williston